Ashwell may refer to:

Places 
Ashwell, Devon
Ashwell, Hertfordshire
Ashwell, Rutland
Ashwell, Somerset
Ashwell, Queensland, a suburb of Ipswich, in Australia

People 
Gilbert Ashwell (1916–2014)
Lena Ashwell (1872–1957)
Richard Ashwell (died 1392)
Thomas Ashwell (1470s–16th-century)
Arthur Rawson Ashwell (1824–1879)
John Ashwell (died 1541)
Johnny Ashwell (born 1954)
Pauline Ashwell (born 1928)
Rachel Ashwell (born 1959)
Ashwell Prince (born 1977)

Buildings 
Ashwell (HM Prison)